Brezhnev is a 2005 biographical TV movie about Soviet leader Leonid Brezhnev. It originally aired in four parts on Russia's Channel One.

The movie was an expensive period piece partly filmed in the Kremlin. While nostalgic, the film does not attempt to rehabilitate Brezhnev.

Cast
Sergey Shakurov as Leonid Brezhnev
Artur Vakha as Leonid Brezhnev (young)
Svetlana Kryuchkova as Viktoria Brezhneva
Marina Solopchenko as Viktoria Brezhneva (young)
Sergei Garmash as Stepan Kandaurov
Valeri Zolotukhin as huntsman Igor
Vasily Lanovoy as Yuri Andropov
Vadim Yakovlev as Andrei Gromyko
Igor Yasulovich as Mikhail Suslov
Valery Ivchenko as Nikolai Tikhonov
Yuriy Kuzmenkov as Nikolai Podgorny
Vladimir Menshov as Dmitry Ustinov
Lev Prygunov as Yevgeniy Chazov
Aleksandr Filippenko as Georgy Tsinyov
Vyacheslav Shalevich as Alexei Kosygin
Afanasy Kochetkov as Konstantin Chernenko
Sergei Losev as Nikita Khrushchev
Igor Ivanov as Alexander Shelepin
Igor Chernevich as Andrey Alexandrov-Agentov
Valery Bychenkov as Dmitry Polyansky
Gennadi Bogachyov as Nikolai Shchelokov
Nikolai Kuznetsov as Frol Kozlov
Boris Sokolov as Georgy Tsukanov
Vadim Lobanov as Nikolai Ogarkov
Alexander Semchev as Aleksandr Bovin
Oleg Volku as Vladimir Medvedev, deputy chief of the Brezhnev's guard
Maria Shukshina as the nurse
Andrey Krasko as the barber Tolik
Andrei Zibrov as Konovalchuk, sergeant-major
Sergei Barkovsky as Mikhail Gorbachev

References

External links
 

Channel One Russia original programming
2005 films
Russian political television series
2005 biographical drama films
2000s Russian-language films
Films shot in Moscow
Cultural depictions of Leonid Brezhnev
Cultural depictions of Mikhail Gorbachev
Cultural depictions of Nikita Khrushchev
Russian biographical drama films
2005 Russian television series debuts
2005 Russian television series endings
Russian television films
2000s Russian television series
Moscow Kremlin in fiction
2005 drama films